Al-Neel Sport Club, is an Iraqi football team based in Babil, that plays in the Iraq Division Three.

Stadium
On August 16, 2020, the Ministry of Youth and Sports approved the project to build the Al-Neel Stadium, which will start working during the coming period.

Managerial history
 Saadi Abdul-Hussein 
 Haider Kadhim

See also
 2020–21 Iraq FA Cup

References

External links
 Al-Neel SC on Goalzz.com
 Iraq Clubs- Foundation Dates

2005 establishments in Iraq
Association football clubs established in 2005
Football clubs in Babil